Arnold Roger Manvell (10 October 1909 – 30 November 1987) was the first director of the British Film Academy (1947–1959) and author of many books on films and film-making. He wrote (sometimes in collaboration with Heinrich Fraenkel) many books on Nazi Germany, including biographies of Adolf Hitler, Rudolf Hess, Heinrich Himmler, Joseph Goebbels and Hermann Göring. During World War II, he worked in the Ministry of Information, creating propaganda films for the British government. In his career, he also lectured in universities in as many as forty countries in three continents (America, Europe and the Middle East), and was a broadcaster and screenwriter. He joined the Boston University faculty in 1975 teaching film history classes at the College of Communications. Manvell was named University Professor in 1982.

Biography
Manvell recalled his interest in cinema began when he was five years old, specifically due to film serials and slapstick comedy. He received his PhD from London University on the verse and critical work of poet W.B. Yeats. In his 1944 book Film, Manvell thanked his parents for teaching him "to go to the pictures," and John Grierson for teaching him "to look at them."

Books
Some books authored or co-authored by Roger Manvell.

Novels
The Dreamers 
The Passion

On the arts (film/television/theatre)
A Seat at the Cinema
Age of Communication: Press, Books, Films, Radio, TV
Art in Movement: New Directions in Animation
 The Cinema (annual Pelican film review)
Design in motion
Experiment in the Film
 Film (1944)
Film and The Public (annual Pelican film review)
Film and the Second World War (1974)
The German Cinema
History of the British Film
Images of Madness: Portrayal of Insanity in the Feature Film
The International Encyclopedia of Film
Living Screen: Background to the Film and Television
Love Goddesses of the Movies
Masterworks of the German Cinema: The Golem – Nosferatu – M -The Threepenny Opera
New Cinema in Britain
New Cinema in Europe
New cinema in the U.S.A: The feature film since 1946
On the air: A study of broadcasting in sound and television
The Penguin Film Review (1946-1949)
Progress in Television
 Shakespeare and the Film (1979)
Selected Comedies: Elizabeth Inchbald
The Technique of Film Animation
The Technique of Film Music
Theatre and Film: A Comparative Study of the Two Forms of Dramatic Art and of the Problems of Adaptation of Stage Plays into Films
This Age of Communication
Three British screen plays: "Brief Encounter","Odd man out," "Scott of the Antarctic"
What is Film?

On Nazi Germany
The Canaris Conspiracy
The Conspirators
Doctor Goebbels: His Life & Death
Films and the Second World War
Gestapo
Göring
Hess
Heinrich Himmler: The SS, Gestapo, His Life and Career
Heinrich Himmler
Hitler: The Man and The Myth
The Hundred Days to Hitler
Incomparable Crime, The: Mass Extermination in the Twentieth Century
The July Plot
SS & Gestapo: Rule of Terror

Biography
Chaplin
Elizabeth Inchbald: England's Principal Woman Dramatist and Independent Woman of Letters in 18th Century London – A Biographical Study
Ellen Terry (1968)
Ingmar Bergman, an Appreciation
Sarah Siddons
The Trial of Annie Besant and Charles Bradlaugh

References 

1909 births
1987 deaths
People educated at The King's School, Peterborough
People educated at Wyggeston Grammar School for Boys
English male screenwriters
20th-century English screenwriters
20th-century English male writers